Filipino English may refer to:

 Philippine English, the English language as it is spoken in the Philippines
 Taglish, Tagalog language heavily mixed with American English words
 Bislish, any of the Visayan languages infused with English terms